Alyeska may refer to:

Alaska; Alyeska is an archaic spelling of the Aleut word Alaska meaning "mainland", "great country", or "great land"
A former settlement, abandoned and merged with Girdwood, Anchorage, Alaska
Alyeska Resort, an alpine ski area which developed in the early 1960s in Girdwood
 Alyeska Pipeline Service Company